Kang Seul-gi (born February 10, 1994), known mononymously as Seulgi, is a South Korean singer and dancer. She is a member of girl group Red Velvet, its sub-unit Red Velvet – Irene & Seulgi, and the supergroup Got the Beat. She released her debut EP, 28 Reasons, in 2022.

Life and career

1994–2014: Early life and career beginnings

Kang Seul-gi was born on February 10, 1994, in Ansan, Gyeonggi-do, South Korea. Her family consists of her parents and an older brother. She studied in Ansan Byeolmang Middle School and attended School of Performing Arts Seoul. She can speak both Korean and Japanese.

Seulgi began training at SM Entertainment in 2007. On December 2, 2013, she was one of the first three trainees introduced to the public through SM Entertainment's pre-debut project, SM Rookies, alongside now-NCT members Jeno and Taeyong. Various pre-debut clips of Seulgi were released by SM Entertainment, one of which was a dance performance of "Be Natural" by S.E.S. with Irene. In July 2014, Seulgi was featured on Henry Lau's song "Butterfly" from his second EP Fantastic. She also appeared in the music video of his single "Fantastic".

On August 1, 2014, Seulgi made her official debut as a member of Red Velvet.

2015–2018: Solo activities

In January 2015, Seulgi starred in the musical School Oz, playing the lead role of Dorothy. From April to May, she was part of the variety show Off to School.

In July 2016, Seulgi released "Don't Push Me" with bandmate Wendy as part of the soundtrack of the television series Uncontrollably Fond. In October, Seulgi competed on King of Mask Singer under the alias Cinema Heaven. On November 18, she sang the theme song of the MMORPG Blade & Soul, "You, Just Like That" (그대는 그렇게), although it was not officially released as a digital single until 2017. On December 30, Seulgi released the digital single "Sound of Your Heart" with Wendy and other SM artists for the digital music project SM Station.

In January 2017, Seulgi released "You're the Only One I See" with Wendy as part of the soundtrack of the drama Hwarang: The Poet Warrior Youth. As part of SM Station, she also released the duet "Darling U" with labelmate Yesung on January 22. In February, Seulgi and Hwang Chi-yeul collaborated on the song "Our Story", which served as the final track for Hwang's duet project Fall, in girl. In March, Seulgi featured on labelmate Mark's "Drop", an original song performed on High School Rapper. Seulgi was cast alongside six other female idols in the variety show Idol Drama Operation Team, wherein they had to create their own television series, titled Let's Only Walk the Flower Road, as scriptwriters and play fictional versions of themselves, who are part of a fictional music group. The group, called Girls Next Door, released the song "Deep Blue Eyes" and held their debut stage at Music Bank on July 14. On October 27, Seulgi released a remake of the 2001 song "Doll (인형)", originally by Shin Hye-sung and Lee Ji-hoon, along with Kangta and Wendy as part of the second season of SM Station. An accompanying music video featuring footage from their live performance of the song at the SM Town Live Tour V in Japan was released on the same day. That same month, Seulgi featured on labelmate Taemin's song "Heart Stop" from his second studio album Move.

In February 2018, Seulgi was confirmed as part of the cast of Law of the Jungle in Mexico. In April, she was confirmed as part of the cast of the variety show Secret Unnie. She featured on Moonbyul's debut single "Selfish", which was released on May 23. Seulgi and Wendy starred in the special 100th episode of Battle Trip, which aired for the first time on July 21. In September, Seulgi released the digital single "Wow Thing" with Soyeon, SinB, and Chungha. In October, it was announced that Seulgi had been cast in the television show Cool Kids. On October 15, she featured on Zion.T's "Hello Tutorial", which peaked at number two on the Gaon Digital Chart.

2019–present: Red Velvet sub-unit, Got the Beat and solo debut

On February 12, 2019, Seulgi released "Always", a ballad about eternal love, for the soundtrack of The Crowned Clown.

On April 20, 2020, SM Entertainment confirmed that Seulgi would be part of Red Velvet's first sub-unit, alongside bandmate Irene. Red Velvet – Irene & Seulgi debuted on July 6 with the extended play (EP) Monster. The EP contained the studio version of Seulgi's solo song "Uncover", which was first revealed during Red Velvet's third concert tour La Rouge. She and Irene starred in the spin-off of Red Velvet's reality show Level Up Project!. On November 23, it was announced that Seulgi would translate the series of art essays Art Gallery By My Side: Love, Happiness, Sleep.

On January 25, 2021, Seulgi featured in the music video for labelmate Yunho's "Eeny Meeny". On February 1, Seulgi and rapper Bewhy released a music video for the song "Born Confident" for a Volkswagen campaign. On March 30, it was announced that Seulgi would feature on Wendy's song "Best Friend" from her debut EP Like Water. On April 2, it was announced that Seulgi would host a web music program, The Wise Music Encyclopedia. On June 1, she started hosting her own live show, Seulgi.zip, on Naver Now. On June 7, Seulgi teamed up with NCT's Taeyong on the release of the demo song "Rose" on SoundCloud. The duo co-composed the song with producer SQUAR. On December 28, Seulgi featured on BamBam's song "Who Are You" from his second EP B. On December 27, Seulgi was revealed as a member of the supergroup Got the Beat, alongside bandmate Wendy. The group debuted on January 3, 2022.

On September 13, 2022, it was announced that Seulgi would debut as a soloist with the release of her first EP, titled 28 Reasons, on October 4, led the single of the same.

Public image and influence
From performance to visual media, Seulgi is an all-rounder artist. Brands often cite her positivity, creativity, passion for her craft, unique sensibility and style and cultural influence (especially among young Koreans) as reasons for why they choose her to represent them.

In Gallup Korea's Idol Preference poll, before its discontinuation in 2020, Seulgi ranked as one of the most popular idols. She topped the monthly "Individual Girl Group Members Brand Power Ranking" published by the Korean Corporate Reputation Research Institute several times. In a survey among soldiers doing mandatory military service in South Korea in 2019, Seulgi ranked as the fourth most popular female K-pop idol. She has also consistently placed high in the Korea Queer Women Community's annual poll due to admiration for her "girl crush" image.

Seulgi has also been recognized for her fashion sense. Her casual, chic and trendy style has made her an emerging leader in casual fashion and a reference for the MZ generation in South Korea. In particular, her influence on the rise of minimalist fashion among Koreans in their 20s and 30s has been highlighted. In her show Seulgi.zip, a mainly fashion-themed program, Seulgi discussed fashion items, style points and favorite trends with her guests and gave advice to her listeners. Seulgi became the first K-pop act to be selected as global ambassador for Italian luxury brand Salvatore Ferragamo. A brand representative stated that they selected for her popularity as a fashion icon, a successful performer, and an influential entertainer.

Other ventures

Endorsements

Aside from various endorsements with her bandmates, Seulgi has served as brand ambassadors individually. In March 2018, she was selected to model Nike's collection for the South Korea national football team, the Red Devils 2018 Collection. Since August 2018, Seulgi has been the face of Converse Korea as their first female brand ambassador. Starting with the "One Star" campaign under the slogan "no one can evaluate me", Seulgi and Converse have campaigned for support on one's own values and standards.

On December 23, 2019, Seulgi was announced as the face of Coca-Cola's 2020 campaign "Little Big Moments" along with actor Park Bo-gum. Several days later, French retailer L'Occitane debuted a new campaign featuring Seulgi, as well as two other artists, art director Cha In-cheol and illustrator Kim Se-dong. Seulgi served as ambassador for L'Occitane and OMY's "City Palette" campaign for their shea butter hand cream.

In January 2021, Seulgi became the new ambassador of Volkswagen. She served as the face of a new campaign for their new T-Roc model and helped promote it with original music and video for their slogan "Born Confident". In February, Seulgi was officially announced as the South Korean brand ambassador of the Italian luxury brand Salvatore Ferragamo through a photoshoot with Harper's Bazaar and was later on announced on June 29 as a global brand ambassador through their shoe capsule collection campaign, "Let's Dance". In April, Seulgi was announced as the newest model for cosmetics brand AMUSE. In December, she became the muse of Istkünst, a Korean unisex streetwear brand.

Arts and photography
In addition to her work as a dancer and vocalist, Seulgi has earned praise from various online communities for her art and photography skills. In 2016, Seulgi was chosen as the honorary ambassador for the 18th Bucheon International Fantastic Film Festival to help spread the festival's mission to spread public awareness on animated films and help students and lesser known artists in the field gain more opportunities. In 2019, Seulgi voiced an audio guide in M. Chat exhibit's of world class graffiti artists at Seoul Arts Center.

French company L'Occitane collaborated with Seulgi in 2019 for their "City Palette" campaign. Seulgi designed a city map for eco bags to convey the beauty of nature in cities that are heavily affected by pollution.

Due to Seulgi's love for the arts, Maronie Books asked Seulgi to translate their Art Museum By My Side project in 2020. The series is a collection of 35 artworks for each theme of Love, Happiness and Sleep, aiming to serve as guide to those who find it difficult to enjoy art due to lack of professional knowledge. Seulgi's translation of the book, originally written in English by Shana Gozansky, presented both the text and Seulgi's interpretations and featured notes on her personal favorites.

In November 2021, Seulgi joined the Lacoste and Peanuts "We Play Collective" campaign that aimed to promote harmony among diverse people, wherein participants selected famous Peanuts quotes and expressed them through drawings with motifs that symbolize Lacoste.

On February 10, 2022, Seulgi published a poster book with her very own artworks that she stated convey personal moments of happiness. In August, the luxury jewelry brand Fred Paris collaborated with Seulgi on their first emoji brand campaign, named "Seulggomi" after her bear nickname from fans. From production planning to final design of the character and Kakaotalk stickers, Seulgi personally participated to help demonstrate Fred's brand identity through representative collections worn by her and the character itself.

Discography

Extended plays

Singles

Non-commercial releases

Filmography

Film

Television series

Television shows

Web shows

Radio shows

Music videos

Theatre

Awards and nominations

Notes

References

External links

  

Red Velvet (group) members
South Korean female idols
1994 births
Living people
People from Ansan
SM Rookies members
South Korean guitarists
People from Seoul
South Korean women pop singers
South Korean female models
South Korean television personalities
South Korean dance musicians
South Korean musical theatre actresses
21st-century South Korean women singers